Griffis Sculpture Park is a sculpture park located between Ashford Hollow and East Otto in Cattaraugus County, New York. The  outdoor art museum, which was created by artist Larry W. Griffis Jr in 1966, was the first sculpture park in the United States. Griffis founded the Ashford Hollow Foundation for the Visual and Performing Arts to administer the park, which was most recently headed by Simon Griffis, son of Larry Griffis, until Simon's death at Zoar Valley in June 2010. Other members of the Griffis family have also served on the AHF board of directors.

The park draws 35,000 visitors annually. Admission is $5 per person, which is paid on a volunteer basis with QR codes (PayPal or Venmo) scannable near the entrance to the park. The park is also supported by private donations and fund raisers.  The park is open from May to October.

History
The idea for an outdoor sculpture museum came to artist Larry Griffis while he was touring Italy with his family. While watching his children play on the ruins of Emperor Hadrian’s villa, Griffis realized the value of interactive art. As Simon Griffis recalls, his father said, "This is absolutely remarkable. Look at my kids. I've taken them to the finest museums and galleries but they've come alive in this environment where they can interact and they can smell the flowers and they can touch things."

Upon returning to the United States, Larry Griffis looked at many possible sites for the park, but had a vision that included site-specific terrain. He required a combination of valleys, woods, lake and open space. Kissing Bridge Ski Resort in Concord and Lewiston's ArtPark were possible candidates for the vision, but were passed over by the artist.

In 1966, Griffis purchased  near Ashford Hollow in the Southern Tier of Western New York and placed 15 of his own  welded steel works on a hillside along a country road. The Ashford Hollow Foundation acquired another  and drummed up commissions for additional sculptures.

Art
More than 100 local, national and international artists have contributed to this park, although much of the art features members of the Griffis family. Other artist include Bolinski, Bellavia, Dwain, Gurst, Hatchett, Patterson, Mehrdad Hadighi, and Lauren Scime. The sculptures are cast in bronze, welded steel, aluminum and wood, and are arranged in twelve groups based on theme. These groups include various oversized animals and insects, life-size nudes (men and women), or sets such as castles or submarines.

References

External links

 Griffis Sculpture Park Home Page

Sculpture gardens, trails and parks in New York (state)
Museums in Cattaraugus County, New York
Outdoor sculptures in New York (state)
Art museums and galleries in New York (state)
Parks in Cattaraugus County, New York
Art museums established in 1966
1966 establishments in New York (state)